Montgomery White Sulphur Springs Cottage, also known as Haley House, was a historic home located at Christiansburg, Virginia.  It was a one-story, four bay, frame dwelling with a standing seam metal hipped roof and central chimney.  It was one of three surviving structures from the Montgomery White Sulphur Springs resort.  When the resort closed in 1904, the cottage was moved to Christiansburg.  It was demolished in 1995–1996.

It was listed on the National Register of Historic Places in 1989, and delisted in 2001.

References

Former National Register of Historic Places in Virginia
Houses on the National Register of Historic Places in Virginia
Italianate architecture in Virginia
Houses completed in 1904
Houses in Montgomery County, Virginia
National Register of Historic Places in Montgomery County, Virginia